Ili, the only sub-provincial autonomous prefecture of the People's Republic of China, located in Xinjiang, is made up of the following administrative divisions.

The following table lists only the prefecture-level and county-level divisions of Ili.

Ili